Paraptila symmetricana is a species of moth of the family Tortricidae. It is found in Bolivia.

The length of the forewings is about 9 mm. The ground colour of the forewings is dark brown in the basal area, followed by a grey-brown area with yellow-brown striae. There is a dark red-brown patch and a silver-white patch bordering the costa. The hindwings are grey brown.

References

Moths described in 1991
Euliini